Sergei Valeryevich Grichenkov (born 8 July 1986) is a former Russian professional footballer.

Club career
He made his debut for PFC CSKA Moscow on 6 July 2005 in a Russian Cup game against FC Torpedo Vladimir. He made his first start on 15 March 2006 in the next Russian Cup round against FC Spartak Kostroma.

He played in the Russian Football National League for FC Sodovik Sterlitamak in 2007.

Honours
 Russian Cup winner: 2006.

External links
 

1986 births
Footballers from Moscow
Living people
Russian footballers
Association football defenders
PFC CSKA Moscow players
FC SKA Rostov-on-Don players
FC Sodovik Sterlitamak players
FC Daugava players
FC Lokomotiv Moscow players
Latvian Higher League players
Russian expatriate footballers
Expatriate footballers in Latvia
Russian expatriate sportspeople in Latvia